Kevin Haslam may refer to:

 Kevin Haslam (American football coach), college sports administrator and former college football coach
 Kevin Haslam (American football player) (born 1986), American football offensive tackle